NGC 4451 is a spiral galaxy in the equatorial Virgo constellation. It was discovered at the Copenhagen Observatory on March 19, 1865 by Heinrich d'Arrest, who used an 11" refractor telescope. The galaxy is located at a distance of 85 million light years and is receding with a heliocentric radial velocity of 862 km/s. It is a member of the Virgo cluster of galaxies.

In March 1985, Shigo Horiguchi in Japan discovered a Type II-P supernova in this galaxy.

References

External links 
 

4451
Virgo (constellation)
Unbarred spiral galaxies
041050